Erik Smaaland is a Norwegian music Producer and Songwriter, who had his international breakthrough with “Alone, Pt. II” by Alan Walker and Ava Max which hit top 20 in 7 countries and peaked at No 77 on Spotify globally, and Robin Schulz feat Alida “In Your Eyes” hit the top3 on the German Airplay charts, and hit the Billboard Dance #1 with only weeks apart.  He also managed to get 3 #1 singles in his home country Norway in the first 3 months of 2020. In late 2020, he produced and co-wrote the single "One More Dance" with R3HAB, and in early 2021 produced and co-wrote "Love Again" by Alok, and Vize, Weight Of The World by Armin Van Buuren, One More Time the lead single of Robin Schulz album IIII, a collaboration with Felix Jaehn, and Scandal from the Taste Of Love EP from TWICE Since that Smaaland has written and produced singles for artists like Tiesto, Jonas Blue, R3HAB, Dillon Francis, Lukas Graham, and Armin Van Buuren.

Erik Smaaland got his Norwegian breakthrough in 2017 with Hkeem's “Fy Faen” that reached No. 1 in Norway and Top20 in Sweden. He has since that produced and array of top20 charters for local Norwegian acts.

He won “Song Of The Year” at the Norwegian Spellemann Awards 2017, was nominated for “Best Breakthrough Songwriter” at the Norwegian Publishhers Award 2017 and was behind 4 nominations at the 2020 Norwegian Spellemann Awards, 3 Song Of The Year Nominations with Alan Walker, and Tix, and one for best Pop

Notes

Living people
Norwegian music people
1986 births